The Sauk Valley Predators are a Premier Basketball League team that began play in the 2012 season. Based in Northwestern Illinois, the Predators play their home games at several sites in the region, including Sterling High School in Sterling, Illinois and Highland Community College in Freeport among others. The Predators team included players such as Carlton Fay (Southern Illinois University), Jereme Richmond (University of Illinois), Mike Rose (Eastern Kentucky) and Herman Favors (Georgia State). Head coach Kevin Keathley led the team to a winning season and a playoff appearance. Keathley was assisted by Kirk Engelkens and Ryan Vazquez. Darrick Druce was the strength and conditioning coach.

External links
Sauk Valley Predators website
PBL press release announcing the Predators' addition

Former Premier Basketball League teams
Basketball teams in Illinois
Basketball teams established in 2011
2011 establishments in Illinois